The Athlone Railway Bridge, also known as the White Bridge, is a railway bridge over the River Shannon at Athlone, Ireland.

History and Technical Details 
The bridge was built in 1851 and took 18 months to complete. It was designed by G.W. Hemans, and built with a central span which can be opened to accommodate tall sailing craft. The iron-work was shipped to Limerick and then was transferred to Athlone by barge. The twelve cylindrical pillars are each  in diameter.

The bridge is listed in the National Inventory of Architectural Heritage under number 15004129.

References 

Railway bridges in the Republic of Ireland
Bridges completed in 1851
Buildings and structures in County Westmeath